The UK Carrier Strike Group (UKCSG) is a carrier battle group of the Royal Navy. It has existed in various forms since the mid-2000s. Between 2006 and 2011, the formation centred around the Royal Navy's s until the retirement of their Harrier GR9 strike aircraft in 2011 as a result of the Strategic Defence and Security Review. The aim of the CSG is to facilitate carrier-enabled power projection.

Overview

Role
As a unit within the Royal Navy, the UK Carrier Strike Group's role is to facilitate carrier-enabled power projection (CEPP) in support of the UK's interests. As a self-contained force, it is capable of operating independently or as part of a wider operation. The unit is centred around either of two Queen Elizabeth-class aircraft carriers, which are designed to carry up to 40 aircraft each, with accompanying surface ships and submarines providing protection from air, surface and undersea threats. Initially, only one carrier strike group was to be maintained, however, under current strategic planning, two carrier strike groups will now be maintained with one held at very high readiness and the other at lower readiness. Both of these groups can surge and form a combined unit if required.

Size and composition
The size and composition of the UKCSG varies depending on operational requirements which are decided upon during operational planning. A typical CSG consists of a Queen Elizabeth-class aircraft carrier, two surface escorts (with one being a Type 23 frigate for anti-submarine warfare and the other being a Type 45 destroyer for anti-air warfare), a submarine and a fleet tanker. In the future, escort duties will also be provided by the Royal Navy's new Type 26 frigate. For replenishment-at-sea, the Royal Fleet Auxiliary provides its Tide-class fleet tankers, which were specifically designed to refuel the aircraft carriers, in addition to RFA Fort Victoria for dry stores. Currently, Fort Victoria is the only ship capable of resupplying the aircraft carriers with dry stores, however a programme to replace her with three new fleet solid support ships is currently underway. Additionally, escorts and support ships may be provided by allies. Overseas, the UK has established a number of naval facilities to support the UKCSG, including the naval base  and the UK Joint Logistics Support Base, which are located in Bahrain and Oman, respectively.

The Queen Elizabeth-class aircraft carriers are designed to carry around 40 aircraft but can carry up to 72 at maximum capacity. Its Carrier Air Wing (CVW) will consist of up to 24 F-35B Lightning II multirole fighters by 2023. This is in addition to around 14 helicopters of varying types. For a Maritime Force Protection tasking, the CVW may consist of nine Merlin HM2 anti-submarine warfare helicopters and five Merlin HM2 Crowsnest for airborne early warning (AEW). Alternatively, for a Littoral Manoeuvre package, it may consist of a mixture of Chinook and Merlin Mk3i/4 transport helicopters and Apache AH1 and Wildcat AH1 attack helicopters. By 2030, the Royal Navy aims to replace some of these helicopter platforms with medium-sized fixed wing unmanned aerial vehicles, currently known as Vixens, capable of undertaking strike, air-to-air refueling, electronic warfare and airborne early warning missions.

Operational history

2006–2011

The earliest iteration of the UK Carrier Strike Group originally formed in 2006 with Commodore Alan Richards in command. In one of its final deployments, it demonstrated its capabilities alongside the U.S. Navy off the east coast of the United States during Exercise Auriga in 2010. Following the exercise, the captain of Ark Royal remarked: "Today was a great opportunity for us to demonstrate some of the capabilities that the UK Carrier Strike Group has, particularly the GR9 Harrier and Merlin ASW helicopters operating from HMS Ark Royal". As an example of the size and composition of a UK CSG of that era, the Auriga CSG consisted of the aircraft carrier HMS Ark Royal, along with her air wing of Harrier GR9 strike aircraft, Merlin HM1 anti-submarine warfare (ASW) helicopters and Sea King MK7 airborne surveillance and control (ASaC) helicopters. The aircraft carrier was escorted by the Type 42 destroyer  and Type 23 frigate , in addition to French Navy submarine Perle and U.S. Navy destroyer .  of the Royal Fleet Auxiliary provided replenishment.

In 2010, the British government announced that all Harriers would be retired from service, along with HMS Ark Royal. This left Illustrious serving in a helicopter carrier role whilst replacement aircraft carriers and their associated air wings were procured. The UK Carrier Strike Group dissolved in 2011 with Commodore Simon J. Ancona as its final commander. Illustrious later went on to decommission in 2014, three years ahead of her replacement.

2015–present

In 2015, the UKCSG was re-formed with Commodore Jerry Kyd as its commander. Under his direction, the UK CSG battle staff grew to include 22 core one-star battle staff by 2016. Kyd was later succeeded by Commodore Andrew Betton during the same year, who himself was succeeded in 2018 by Commodore Mike Utley, before the current commander, Commodore Stephan Moorhouse, took command in 2019. Prior to the entry into service of HMS Queen Elizabeth and her sister ship Prince of Wales, the Royal Navy cooperated with its allies to preserve and develop its skills in carrier strike group operations. This primarily involved Royal Navy ships and personnel training with U.S. Navy and French carrier strike groups.

The current UKCSG assembled at sea for the first time in October 2020 during Exercise Joint Warrior. It comprised a total of nine ships, 15 fighter aircraft (five from the Royal Air Force and 10 from the U.S. Marine Corps), 11 helicopters and 3,000 personnel. The Royal Navy ships included the aircraft carrier HMS Queen Elizabeth along with two frigates, two destroyers, a replenishment ship and a solid support ship. The U.S. Navy and Royal Netherlands Navy also provided an escort each. The exercise saw the largest number of aircraft on a British aircraft carrier since 1983, in addition to the largest number of F-35Bs at sea across the globe. The exercise was a rehearsal for an operational deployment scheduled for 2021, known as CSG21.

Following Exercise Joint Warrior, the UK CSG reached its initial operating capability (IOC) milestone in January 2021. This milestone marked the successful operation of all components of the CSG and made it available for operational deployments for the first time.

Carrier Strike Group 21

On 22 May 2021, following a farewell visit from Queen Elizabeth II, the UK Carrier Strike Group left HMNB Portsmouth on its first operational deployment, a seven-and-a-half month roundtrip to the Pacific, visiting over 40 countries. In total, approximately 3,700 sailors, aviators and marines from across the three countries were involved with the deployment. The strike group's air component amounted to over 30 aircraft, the majority of which were onboard HMS Queen Elizabeth. These included eight F-35B Lightning multirole combat aircraft from No. 617 Squadron RAF and ten from the United States Marine Corps' VMFA-211 "Wake Island Avengers". Three Merlin HM2 Crowsnest airborne surveillance and control (ASaC) aircraft were also deployed on the type's first operational deployment.

The strike group also carried out its first ever combat operations, launching F-35B Lightning multirole combat aircraft on strike sorties against Islamic State in Iraq and Syria. Whilst these missions were underway, HMS Defender and HNLMS Evertsen detached from the strike group and headed into the Black Sea to carry out Freedom of Navigation Operations (FONOPs). Whilst transiting from Odessa, Ukraine to Batumi, Georgia, HMS Defender entered the waters around Crimea, the centre of a Russian-Ukrainian sovereignty dispute, which resulted in the Russian authorities firing warning shots. Elsewhere in the Black Sea, HNLMS Evertsen also faced mock attacks by the Russian Air Force. To further monitor the strike group, Russia deployed strike bombers equipped with Kh-47M2 Kinzhal anti-ship ballistic missiles to an airbase in Syria. By 7 July 2021, both HMS Defender and HNLMS Evertsen had rejoined the strike group and it left the region via the Suez Canal. HMS Diamond was no longer part of the strike group, having suffered a defect.

The carrier strike group then exercised with the Indian Navy in the Bay of Bengal before exercising with the navies of Singapore, Malaysia and Thailand in the Strait of Malacca. Finally, in the Indo-Pacific region, the strike group exercised with the Japanese Maritime Self-Defence Force and Republic of Korea Navy.

During its return trip, the strike group exercised with the Italian Navy in the Mediterranean; HMS Queen Elizabeth set a record by hosting jets from three different nations on a single flightdeck. During its time in the Mediterranean, HMS Queen Elizabeth suffered its first loss of an F-35B when one crashed into the sea following an aborted takeoff. The pilot ejected safely but the aircraft was a complete loss and was subsequently recovered from the seabed two weeks later. The strike group returned to the UK and concluded its deployment on 9 December 2021.

The CSG21 deployment was covered by documentary filmmaker Chris Terrill in a BBC series, named The Warship: Tour of Duty. It aired on 22 January 2023.

Carrier Strike Group 22
Following the conclusion of CSG21, a 2022 deployment was planned with the involvement of both aircraft carriers. However, HMS Prince of Wales suffered a starboard propeller malfunction in August 2022. The deployment was subsequently downscaled as HMS Queen Elizabeth was diverted to the United States to replace Prince of Wales in hosting the Atlantic Future Forum. After returning from the US, Queen Elizabeth embarked eight F-35 jets and seven helicopters. The strike group participated in Operation Achillian with NATO forces in the North Sea to validate NATO's fifth-generation strike capability. Anti-submarine warfare exercises were also carried out alongside RAF P-8 Poseidons operating from RAF Lossiemouth in Scotland.

References

Naval units and formations of the United Kingdom
Expeditionary units and formations